Çayırpınar can refer to:

 Çayırpınar, Çankırı
 Çayırpınar, Çay